I class may refer to:

 Acheron-class destroyer, a class of destroyers that served in World War I
 I-class destroyer, a class of destroyers of the 1930s
 I-class ferry, a class of ferries operated by BC Ferries
 Istanbul-class frigate, a late 2010s class of indigenous Turkish frigates

See also
 Class I (disambiguation)